Yampier Hernández Gonzales (born 30 August 1984 in Havana) is a Cuban boxer who won Bronze at the 2008 Olympics at Light Flyweight.

Boxing career
Southpaw Hernández became Cuba' s number one only after 2004 Olympic Champion Yan Bartelemí, who had beaten him numerous times, had defected. He won the national championship in 2007 and 2008 but didn't medal at the PanAm Games 2007 after losing to Luis Yanez.

At the second qualifier in 2008, he lost to Winston Mendez Montero but beat Oscar Negrete in the third place bout.

He lost his Olympic semifinal to Mongol Pürevdorjiin Serdamba and won Bronze.

Olympic Games
2008 (as a Light Flyweight)
Defeated Sherali Dostiev (Tajikistan) 12-1
Defeated Georgiy Chygayev (Ukraine) 21-3
Defeated Paulo Carvalho (Brazil) 21-6
Lost to Pürevdorjiin Serdamba (Mongolia) 8-8

External links
 Qualifier

Living people
Light-flyweight boxers
1984 births
Boxers at the 2008 Summer Olympics
Olympic boxers of Cuba
Olympic bronze medalists for Cuba
Olympic medalists in boxing
Medalists at the 2008 Summer Olympics
Boxers from Havana
Cuban male boxers
21st-century Cuban people